Ilay Eliyau Elmkies (or Elmakayes, ; born ) is an Israeli professional footballer who plays as a midfielder for German club 1899 Hoffenheim. He also plays for the Israel national team.

Early and personal life
Elmkies was born in Nahariya, Israel, to a family of Sephardic Jewish descent.

He also holds a French passport, which eased his move to certain European football leagues.

Elmkies speaks Hebrew and English and has quickly mastered German. A film looking at the Jewish experience in the German village of Hoffenheim during World War II aired in 2018 at the Sinsheimer Citydome. He played a leading role, and provided commentary in all three languages.

Club career
A 1899 Hoffenheim youth product in Germany, Elmkies was promoted to the club's senior reserve team  1899 Hoffenheim II  in 2019.

International career
He also plays for the Israel national Under-21 team since 2019.

Elmkies received his first call-up to the senior Israel national team in October 2019 ahead of the UEFA Euro 2020 qualifiers matches against Austria and Latvia. He made his senior debut on 15 October 2019 in a home match against Latvia; he was substituted in the 76' minute, as his native Israel won 3–1.

On 7 September 2020, he scored his first goal – an equalizer in the 91' minute for the senior Israeli squad in a 2020–21 UEFA Nations League home match against Slovakia, that ended in a 1–1 draw.

Career statistics

International goals
Scores and results list Israel's goal tally first, score column indicates score after each Elmkies goal.

See also 

 List of Jewish footballers
 List of Jews in sports

References

External links
 
 

2000 births
Living people
Israeli Sephardi Jews
Jewish footballers
Israeli footballers
TSG 1899 Hoffenheim II players
TSG 1899 Hoffenheim players
ADO Den Haag players
FC Admira Wacker Mödling players
Regionalliga players
Bundesliga players
Eredivisie players
Austrian Football Bundesliga players
Austrian Regionalliga players
Israeli expatriate footballers
Expatriate footballers in Germany
Expatriate footballers in the Netherlands
Expatriate footballers in Austria
Israeli expatriate sportspeople in Germany
Israeli expatriate sportspeople in the Netherlands
Israeli expatriate sportspeople in Austria
Footballers from Nahariya
Israel youth international footballers
Israel under-21 international footballers
Israel international footballers
Association football midfielders
Israeli Mizrahi Jews
Israeli Jews